Hugh Montgomerie Hamilton (26 June 1854 – 11 August 1930) was an Australian barrister and judge who played international rugby union for Scotland from 1874 to 1875.

Early life
Hamilton was born at Parramatta in the Colony of New South Wales, the eldest son of Margaret Clunes  and Hugh Hamilton, a pastoralist from Ayrshire, Scotland. He was educated at Geneva, Edinburgh and Marlborough College.

Rugby Union career

Amateur career

Hamilton was a member of the Marlborough College rugby team for 3 years, the last as captain, subsequently playing for West of Scotland and Marlborough Nomads.

International career

In 1874 he was selected by both England and Scotland for the fixture at The Oval on 23 February 1874, electing to play for Scotland.

His second - and last - match for Scotland, again against England, was the fixture at Raeburn Place, Edinburgh on 8 March 1875. He is credited with introducing the passing game into rugby union, along with (Sir) William Milton.

Legal career 
Hamilton was a student of the Inner Temple from 22 May 1875, studying law at the University of London and graduating in 1877. He was called to the bar on 15 May 1878. He practiced as a barrister for 11 years before returning to Sydney in 1890. On 12 May 1914 he was appointed a judge of the District Court of NSW, where he served for more than 19 years, before being retired at age 70 in 1924.

Personal life 
He married Adelaide Eliza Margaret Northcott on 18 March 1880. He married a second time to Minnie  who predeceased him on 9 August 1924. He died at Strathfield on 11 August 1930 (aged 76), survived by a daughter and two sons from his second marriage.

References

1854 births
1930 deaths
Scottish rugby union players
Scotland international rugby union players
West of Scotland FC players
Rugby union forwards
Rugby union players from New South Wales
Judges of the District Court of NSW
20th-century Australian judges